Red-legged tortoise may refer to:

 Red-footed tortoise, a tortoise  native to South America.
 Wood turtle, a North America turtle.

See also 
 Red turtle (disambiguation)

Animal common name disambiguation pages